Samuel Adams Drake (December 20, 1833December 4, 1905) was a United States journalist and writer.

Biography
Samuel Adams Drake was born in Boston on December 20, 1833, a son of Samuel Gardner Drake. He was educated in the public schools of Boston.

He went to Kansas in 1858 as telegraphic agent of the New York Associated Press, became the regular correspondent of the St. Louis Republican and the Louisville Journal, and for a while edited the Leavenworth Times. In 1861 he joined the state militia and served throughout the American Civil War, becoming brigadier general of militia in 1863. In 1864, he was colonel of the 17th Kansas Volunteers, commanding the post of Paola, Kansas, during Price's invasion of Missouri in that year.

He returned to Boston in 1871 and resumed literary work.

He married Isabelle G. Mayhew in 1858. In 1867, he remarried to O. M. Grant.

He died in Kennebunkport, Maine on December 4, 1905.

Works
 Hints for Emigrants to Pike's Peak, a pamphlet and his first publication (1860)
 Old Landmarks of Boston (1873)
 Nooks and Corners of the New England Coast (1875)
 Bunker Hill (1875)
 Captain Nelson (1879)
 History of Middlesex County, Massachusetts (1880)
 Around the Hub (1881)
 Heart of the White Mountains (1882)
 New England Legends and Folk Lore (1884)
 Our Great Benefactors (1885)
 The Making of New England (1886)
 The Making of the Great West (1887)
 Burgoyne's Invasion (1889)
 The Taking of Louisburg (1891)
 The Pine Tree Coast (1891)
 The Battle of Gettysburg (1892)
 The Making of Virginia (1893)
 Our Colonial Homes (1894)
 The Campaign of Trenton (1895)
 The Watch Fires of '76 (1895)
 On Plymouth Rock (1898)
 The Myths and Fables of To-day (1900)
 The Young Vigilantes (1904)

Notes

References

External links
 
 
 

1833 births
1905 deaths
American male journalists
Writers from Boston
Historians from Massachusetts